The Fastest Gun Alive is a 1956 MGM Western film starring Glenn Ford, Jeanne Crain, and Broderick Crawford directed by Russell Rouse.

Plot

Son of a notorious fast-drawing sheriff, George Kelby Jr. (Ford) and his wife Dora (Jeanne Crain) settle down in the peaceful town of Cross Creek as the owner of a general store under assumed identities to avoid having to continually face men out to become famous for shooting down the "fastest gun alive".  Now known as George Temple, he becomes a mild-mannered teetotalling shopkeeper, little respected by the other townsfolk.

One day comes news that outlaw Vinnie Harold (Crawford) has gunned down Clint Fallon (Walter Coy), reputedly the "fastest draw in the west." George listens to the townsmen talk about Wyatt Earp, Wes Hardin, and other so-called "fast guns". They are also laughing at George, seeing him as nothing but a "ribbon clerk".

His pride stung, George retrieves a gun from hiding (he told his wife he had tossed it into a river years ago)  and—over her desperate pleading not to destroy the peaceful life they have built—says "they have to know who I am." The men are astonished at seeing George wearing a gun, believing him to be drunk. He sets about destroying the myths these men have about gunmen, displaying a detailed knowledge of guns and gunmen they never suspected he had. George then blurts out his secret that he is the fastest gun alive, "... faster than Earp, faster than Hardin, faster than Fallon, and faster than the man who killed him."

With the citizens understandably skeptical, George takes them into the street and gives them a demonstration of his skill. First, with only two shots, he hits two silver dollars tossed into the air on the count of three. Following that, he shoots a beer glass full of beer dropped from Harvey Maxwell's (Allyn Joslyn) hand at 20 feet, hitting it almost immediately after it leaves the man's hand.

Later, while everyone is in church, where they have taken an oath not to tell George's secret, Harold rides into town. A local boy tells him about George's display of gun skill. Though he is on the run—and over the objections of his fellow bank robbers, Taylor Swope (John Dehner) and Dink Wells (Noah Beery Jr.), who just want to escape the law—Harold is intent to remain in town until he can see this George Temple face-to-face.

Harold finds out that the "fast gun" is in the church. He sends Swope there to call him out. When the townspeople refuse to send out "the man who shot two silver dollars at the same time", Harold gives an order to Dink to find some kerosene and pour it everywhere. He then instructs Swope to deliver a message to the people in the church that if their fast gun does not come out in five minutes, Vinnie and his men will burn down the whole town.

The townspeople now try to force George into the street. George must reveal the whole truth, explaining that he is no gunman, that he has never been in a real gunfight. The gun with the notches in the handle actually belonged to his father George Kelby (a famous lawman shot down in an ambush) and he is terrified at the prospect of actually facing a man in a gunfight.

With the posse approaching, Dink's nerve cracks and he rides off. Swope stays longer, but ultimately feels they are risking too much and decides to take his share of the gang's loot, is told by Vinnie to either draw or ride out, but without any of the loot. Swope toys with the idea of drawing on Vinnie, but thinks better of it and leaves.

Realizing that George is too terrified to face Harold, Lou Glover asks George for his gun. Glover intends to pose as George for the sake of the town. Reluctantly, George straps on his gun and walks toward the door, warning everyone not to say anything because it will not take much for him to change his mind.

George meets Vinnie in the street, where both men draw their guns and fire. When a posse pursuing the outlaws shows up with the bodies of Swope and Wells, the townspeople are attending the burials of both Harold and Kelby, telling the posse how the two men shot each other dead. Both the tombstones of Harold and Kelby are dated November 7, 1889. After the posse leaves, it is revealed that Kelby was not killed. A coffin filled with stones, Kelby's gun, and his reputation as "the fastest gun alive", was buried instead. This allows George and Dora to resume their peaceful existence in Cross Creek.

Cast
 Glenn Ford as George Temple
 Jeanne Crain as Dora Temple
 Broderick Crawford as Vinnie Harold
 Russ Tamblyn as Eric Doolittle
 Allyn Joslyn as Harvey Maxwell
 Leif Erickson as Lou Glover
 John Dehner as Taylor Swope
 Noah Beery Jr. as Dink Wells
 J. M. Kerrigan as Kevin McGovern
 Rhys Williams as Brian Tibbs
 Virginia Gregg as Rose Tibbs
 Chubby Johnson as Frank Stringer
 John Doucette as Ben Buddy
 William Phillips as Lars Toomey
 Chris Olsen as Bobby Tibbs
 Paul Birch as Sheriff Bill Toledo
 Florenz Ames as Joe Fenwick
 Joseph Sweeney as Reverend
 Glenn Strange as Sheriff in Silver Rapids 
 Kermit Maynard as	Silver Rapids Deputy
 Dub Taylor as Nolan Brown 
 Kenneth MacDonald as Roebel
 Louis Jean Heydt as Myron Spink 
 John Dierkes as Walter Hutchins 
 Addison Richards as Doc Jennings 
 Walter Coy as Clint Fallon
 Jeri Weil as Linda Hutchins 
 Buddy Roosevelt as a Barfly
 Walter Baldwin as Blind Man Issuing Warning

Production
The film was based on a 30 March 1954 episode of The United States Steel Hour directed by Alex Segal starring Harry Bellaver and Royal Dano.

Russ Tamblyn, who had gained renown for his energetic dancing in MGM's Seven Brides for Seven Brothers (1954), performs a dance routine during a hoedown early in the film that includes a "shovel" dance, i.e. dancing on shovels used as stilts.

Roderick "Rodd" Redwing was Glenn Ford's gun coach and technical advisor for this film. Gun tricks were developed by Rodd Redwing with help from Jim Martin, a four-time California Fast Draw record holder.

Demonstrating his prowess with a gun, the Glenn Ford character asks a citizen to hold a glass of beer away from his body and, upon the count of three, let it drop. He shoots it before it hits the ground. The scene is shot from behind the glass of beer with Ford facing directly into the camera, but is actually the result of trick photography.  (This scene later came back to haunt Ford when, while in the service and on the pistol range, he was forced to prove his "fast draw" skill by an instructor who had seen the movie. Ford once recounted during a The Tonight Show interview how he had to stand there for hours until he succeeded in drawing his pistol and hitting the target.)

Home Media
The film was released in 1994 & 1999 by MGM Home Entertainment on VHS, then re-released in 2010 & 2017 by Warner Home Video (Warner Archive Collection) on DVD.

Reception

Box office
According to MGM records, the film earned $2,246,000 in the US and Canada and $1,289,000 elsewhere, resulting in a profit of $1,292,000.

Critical response
When the film was first released, The New York Times film critic, Bosley Crowther, praised the film and the actors, writing, "Although it is more concerned with mood and motivation than with gunplay, The Fastest Gun Alive, which crashed into the Globe yesterday, emerges as an engrossing and, on occasion, a comic and tricky adventure ... Although it takes a mite too long to reveal the reasons for his actions, Glenn Ford's characterization of a man driven by fear and a desire for a peaceful life is both sensitive and forceful ... John Dehner does a-professionally smooth and funny job as one of his callous sidekicks; Jeanne Crain adds a tender and compassionate stint as Mr. Ford's understanding wife, and Leif Erickson, Allyn Joslyn, Rhys Williams, J. M. Kerrigan, Chris Olsen, the child actor, and Russ Tamblyn, who contributes an acrobatic dance reminiscent of his chore in Seven Brides for Seven Brothers, weigh in with competent performances as Cross Creek's leading lights."

Recently, film critic Dennis Schwartz praised the film, writing, "Though the story gets lost for too long in too much psychological explaining, it redeems itself with a fine action-packed tense ending. Rouse does a nice job keying in on the reactions of the townsmen, stages some fine action sequences and the performances are solid (especially by Ford and Crawford)."

See also
List of American films of 1956

References

External links
 
 
 
 
 The Fastest Gun Alive at DVD Beaver (includes images)
 

1956 films
1956 Western (genre) films
American Western (genre) films
American black-and-white films
Films scored by André Previn
Films directed by Russell Rouse
Films shot in California
Metro-Goldwyn-Mayer films
Films based on television plays
Films adapted into comics
1950s English-language films
1950s American films